Paul Craig is a Scottish mixed martial artist who competes in the Light heavyweight division of the Ultimate Fighting Championship (UFC). A professional competitor since 2013, Craig formerly competed for BAMMA, where he was the BAMMA World Light Heavyweight Champion. As of March 13, 2023, he is #9 in the UFC light heavyweight rankings.

Mixed martial arts career

Early career
Craig's head coach Brian Gallacher took him from no martial arts experience to 8–0 as an amateur, with each of his wins coming via first-round stoppage. As a professional, Craig went 8–0 over four years before being signed by the UFC.

In November 2014, Craig won a K1-rules fight in Germany.

Craig won the BAMMA World Light heavyweight Championship at BAMMA 23 when he defeated Marcin Lazarz by submission. He was set to defend his title against Chris Fields in Dublin, although the fight was postponed following the death of Portuguese fighter João Carvalho. The match up was rescheduled, but failed to take place due to Craig's damaging his ankle ligaments. Craig did not end up defending the title, as he signed a 4-fight deal with the UFC.

Ultimate Fighting Championship
Craig made his promotional debut against Luis Henrique da Silva on 17 December 2016 at UFC on Fox: VanZant vs. Waterson. He won the fight via submission in Round 2 and was awarded a Performance of the Night bonus.

Craig faced Tyson Pedro on 4 March 2017 at UFC 209. He lost the bout via first-round TKO.

Craig faced Khalil Rountree at UFC Fight Night: Nelson vs. Ponzinibbio on 16 July 2017. He lost the fight via knockout in the first round.

Craig faced Magomed Ankalaev on 17 March 2018 at UFC Fight Night 127. He won the fight via submission at 4:59 in Round 3, resulting in the latest submission finish in a 3-round fight in UFC history. He was also awarded a Performance of the Night bonus.

Following the win against Ankalaev, Craig signed a new, four-fight contract with UFC.

Craig faced promotional newcomer Jimmy Crute on 2 December 2018 at UFC Fight Night 142. He lost the fight via kimura in the third round.

Craig faced promotional newcomer Kennedy Nzechukwu on 30 March 2019 at UFC on ESPN 2. He won the fight via submission due to a triangle choke in the third round. This win earned him the Performance of the Night award.

Craig faced Alonzo Menifield on 29 June 2019 at UFC on ESPN 3: Ngannou vs. Dos Santos. He lost the fight via knockout in the first round.

Craig faced Vinicius Moreira on 21 September 2019 at UFC on ESPN+ 17. He won the fight via a rear-naked choke submission in the first round.>  This win earn Craig his fourth Performance of the Night award.

Craig stepped in on short notice to face Maurício Rua on 16 November 2019 at UFC on ESPN+ 22, replacing Sam Alvey, who had withdrawn from the bout due to a broken hand. After three rounds, the back-and-forth fight was declared a split draw.

Craig was expected to face Ryan Spann on 21 March 2020 at UFC Fight Night: Woodley vs. Edwards. However, the event was cancelled.

Craig faced Gadzhimurad Antigulov on 26 July 2020 at UFC on ESPN 14.  He won the fight via submission in round one. This win earned him the Performance of the Night award.

Craig faced Maurício Rua in a rematch on 21 November 2020 at UFC 255. He won the fight via technical knockout in round two.

Craig was scheduled to face Jamahal Hill on 20 March 2021 UFC on ESPN 21. However on 10 March, Hill withdrew from the bout after testing positive for COVID-19. The match was rescheduled for 12 June 2021 at UFC 263. Craig won the bout via TKO in round one after snapping Hill's elbow with an armbar. This win earned him the Performance of the Night award.

Craig was scheduled to face Alexander Gustafsson on 4 September 2021 at  UFC Fight Night 191. However, a week before the event, Gustafsson withdrew due to injury.

Craig faced Nikita Krylov on March 19, 2022 at UFC Fight Night 204. He won the fight via a triangle choke in round one. With this win, he received the Performance of the Night award.

Craig faced Volkan Oezdemir on July 23, 2022, at UFC Fight Night 208. He lost the fight via unanimous decision.

Craig faced Johnny Walker on January 21, 2023, at UFC 283. He lost the fight via technical knockout in the first round.

Brazilian Jiu-Jitsu 
Craig competed in the 2015 British Pro Jiu Jitsu Championship, taking 1st place in the Purple Belt 95+ kg Division and qualifying for the Abu Dhabi World Professional Jiu-Jitsu Championship. He also took 3rd place in the Absolute Purple 75+ kg Division. After defeating Jamahal Hill in 2021, Craig was promoted to black belt.
On 27/08/22, Craig defeated Sam Sweeney in a tough, back and forth sub only grappling match at Holytown Havoc 2.

On September 24, Craig faced Jed Hue in the main event of Polaris 21. Craig was submitted with an ankle-lock 21 seconds.

Personal life
Paul played football before becoming an MMA fighter. He also worked as a football coach before becoming a teacher for an educational charity.

Championships and accomplishments

Mixed martial arts
Ultimate Fighting Championship
Performance of the Night (Seven times) 
Second most submission wins in the UFC Light Heavyweight division history (6)
Most triangle choke submission wins in the UFC Light Heavyweight division history (4)
BAMMA
BAMMA World Light heavyweight Championship (One time)
MMAJunkie.com
2019 March Submission of the Month vs. Kennedy Nzechukwu
Jitsmagazine
2022 MMA Submission of the Year vs. Nikita Krylov at UFC on ESPN+ 62.

Mixed martial arts record

|Loss
|align=center|16–6–1
|Johnny Walker
|TKO (punches)
|UFC 283
|
|align=center|1
|align=center|2:16
|Rio de Janeiro, Brazil
|
|-
|Loss
|align=center|16–5–1
|Volkan Oezdemir
|Decision (unanimous)
|UFC Fight Night: Blaydes vs. Aspinall 
|
|align=center|3
|align=center|5:00
|London, England
|
|-
|Win
|align=center|16–4–1
|Nikita Krylov
|Submission (triangle choke)
|UFC Fight Night: Volkov vs. Aspinall
|
|align=center|1
|align=center|3:57
|London, England
|
|-
|Win
|align=center|15–4–1
|Jamahal Hill
|TKO (elbows and punches)
|UFC 263 
|
|align=center|1
|align=center|1:59
|Glendale, Arizona, United States
|
|-
|Win
|align=center|14–4–1
|Maurício Rua 
|TKO (submission to punches)
|UFC 255
|
|align=center|2
|align=center|3:36
|Las Vegas, Nevada, United States
|
|-
|Win
|align=center|13–4–1
|Gadzhimurad Antigulov
|Submission (triangle choke)
|UFC on ESPN: Whittaker vs. Till 
|
|align=center|1
|align=center|2:06
|Abu Dhabi, United Arab Emirates
|
|-
|Draw 
|align=center|
|Maurício Rua
|Draw (split)
|UFC Fight Night: Błachowicz vs. Jacaré 
|
|align=center|3
|align=center|5:00
|São Paulo, Brazil
| 
|-
|Win
|align=center|12–4
|Vinicius Moreira
|Submission (rear-naked choke)
|UFC Fight Night: Rodríguez vs. Stephens 
|
|align=center|1
|align=center|3:19
|Mexico City, Mexico 
|
|-
|Loss
|align=center|11–4
|Alonzo Menifield
|KO (punches) 
|UFC on ESPN: Ngannou vs. dos Santos 
|
|align=center|1
|align=center|3:19
|Minneapolis, Minnesota, United States
|
|-
|Win
|align=center|11–3
|Kennedy Nzechukwu
|Submission (triangle choke) 
|UFC on ESPN: Barboza vs. Gaethje 
|
|align=center|3
|align=center|4:20
|Philadelphia, Pennsylvania, United States
|
|-
|Loss
|align=center|10–3
|Jimmy Crute
|Submission (kimura)
|UFC Fight Night: dos Santos vs. Tuivasa 
|
|align=center|3
|align=center|4:51
|Adelaide, Australia
| 
|-
|Win
|align=center|10–2
|Magomed Ankalaev
|Submission (triangle choke)
|UFC Fight Night: Werdum vs. Volkov 
|
|align=center|3
|align=center|4:59
|London, England
|
|-
|Loss
|align=center|9–2
|Khalil Rountree Jr.
|KO (punches)
|UFC Fight Night: Nelson vs. Ponzinibbio 
|
|align=center|1
|align=center|4:56
|Glasgow, Scotland
|
|-
|Loss
|align=center|9–1
|Tyson Pedro
|TKO (elbows)
|UFC 209
|
|align=center|1
|align=center|4:10
|Las Vegas, Nevada, United States
|
|-
|Win
|align=center|9–0
|Henrique da Silva
|Submission (armbar)
|UFC on Fox: VanZant vs. Waterson
|
|align=center|2
|align=center|1:59
|Sacramento, California, United States
|
|-
|Win
|align=center|8–0
|Marcin Łazarz
|Submission (triangle choke)
|BAMMA 23 
|
|align=center|1
|align=center|3:51
|London, England
|
|-
| Win
| align=center| 7–0
| Karl Moore
| Submission (guillotine choke)
| BAMMA 22
| 
| align=center| 2
| align=center| 0:48
| Dublin, Ireland
|
|-
| Win
| align=center| 6–0
| Adam Wright
| Submission (armbar)
| Animalistic MMA: Rise of the Alpha
| 
| align=center| 1
| align=center| 0:47
| Preston, England
|
|-
| Win
| align=center| 5–0
| Andrzej Bachorz
| Submission (brabo choke)
| FightStar Championship 5
| 
| align=center| 1
| align=center| 2:37
| Coventry, England
|
|-
| Win
| align=center| 4–0 
| Dan Konecke
| TKO (punches)
| First Fighting Championship: Resurgence 
| 
| align=center| 1
| align=center| 4:18
| Hamilton, Scotland
|
|-
| Win
| align=center| 3–0
| Jon Ferguson
| Submission (triangle choke)
| Full Contact Contender 10
| 
| align=center| 1
| align=center| 1:50
| Bolton, England
| 
|-
| Win
| align=center| 2–0
| Antonio Braga
| Submission (triangle choke)
| Underdog Xtreme Championships 2
| 
| align=center| 1
| align=center| 2:41
| Belfast, Northern Ireland
| 
|-
| Win
| align=center| 1–0
| Brad Conway
| Submission (triangle choke)
| First Fighting Championship 3: Prepare For Glory
| 
| align=center| 1
| align=center| 2:00
| Hamilton, Scotland
| 
|-
|}

|-
|Win
|align=center| 3–0
|Jeff Metcalfe 
|Submission (guillotine choke) 
|Supremacy Fight Challenge 8 
|Nov 11, 2012
|align=center|1
|align=center|0:46
|Gateshead, England
|
|-
|Win
|align=center| 2–0
|Paul Bradshaw 
|Submission (triangle choke) 
|MMA Total Combat 50 
|Oct 6, 2012
|align=center|1
|align=center|2:41
|Sunderland, England
|
|-
|Win
|align=center| 1–0
|Paul Bradshaw 
|Submission (armbar) 
|MMA Total Combat 48
|Jul 21, 2012
|align=center|1
|align=center|1:26
|Sunderland, England
|
|-
|}

Submission grappling record
{| class="wikitable sortable" style="font-size:80%; text-align:left;"
|-
| colspan=8 style="text-align:center;" | 2 Matches, 1 Wins, 1 Losses, 0 Draws
|-
!  Result
!  Rec.
!  Opponent
!  Method
!  text-center| Event
!  Date
!  Division
!  Location
|-
| Loss ||align=center|1-1||  Jed Hue || Submisson, (Estima lock) || Polaris 21: Grapple Island || September 24, 2022 || Openweight ||  Cagliari, Italy
|-
| Win ||align=center|1-0||  Sam Sweeney || Submisson, (Rear Naked Choke) || Holytown Havoc 2 || August 8, 2022 || Openweight ||  Holytown, Scotland

See also

 List of current UFC fighters
 List of male mixed martial artists

References

External links 
 
 

Year of birth missing (living people)
Living people
Light heavyweight mixed martial artists
Scottish male mixed martial artists
British wushu practitioners
Sportspeople from Airdrie, North Lanarkshire
Ultimate Fighting Championship male fighters
Mixed martial artists utilizing wushu
Mixed martial artists utilizing Brazilian jiu-jitsu
Scottish practitioners of Brazilian jiu-jitsu
People awarded a black belt in Brazilian jiu-jitsu